Pudsey Lowtown railway station is a closed railway station in Pudsey, in the former West Riding of Yorkshire, located about  west of Leeds station. It served the eastern parts of the town of Pudsey.

It was opened to passengers on 1 April 1878 as an intermediate station on the single-track branch line from Bramley to Pudsey Greenside, built by the Great Northern Railway. Freight traffic on this line had already started in 1877. In 1893 the line was double-tracked and extended beyond Pudsey Greenside through Greenside Tunnel towards Laisterdyke and Dudley Hill, forming the Pudsey Loop. Upon the reorganisation of the railways in 1923, the line passed to the London and North Eastern Railway, and in 1948 to the Eastern Region of British Railways.

The station was located on a north–south section of the line, south of the bridge of Lowtown street (B6154) across the railway cutting, with the station building standing near the road at the northern end of the station. The platforms flanking the tracks were located west of the station building, the train tracks and goods facilities to the east.

The station and the line in its entirety were closed to all traffic on 15 June 1964. The site of the former station is now occupied by housing, and the cutting in its vicinity has been filled in for the most part. A bus stop is located next to the bridge across the former railway line.

References

External links 
  Photo of the platforms

Disused railway stations in Leeds
Pudsey
Former Great Northern Railway stations
Railway stations in Great Britain opened in 1878
Railway stations in Great Britain closed in 1964
Beeching closures in England